Ben & Holly's Little Kingdom is a British preschool animated television series. The show was created by Neville Astley and Mark Baker, and produced by Astley Baker Davies and Entertainment One (the companies responsible for Peppa Pig). Many of the voice actors who worked on Peppa Pig have lent their voices to the show; these include John Sparkes, Sarah Ann Kennedy, David Rintoul and David Graham. The music is produced by Julian Nott, who is noted for his Wallace and Gromit and Peppa Pig scores. Ben & Holly's Little Kingdom is the third show to be produced by Astley Baker Davies.

Overview
The show is set in the Little Kingdom which is hidden among thorny brambles. The Little Kingdom is ruled by King and Queen Thistle, mainly from the Little Castle, where they live with their three daughters; 8-year-old Princess Holly, and younger twins Daisy and Poppy. Elves including 8-year-old Ben live at the Great Elf Tree, which acts as a school, library, apartment block and factory for toys and wands. Elves hold the belief that they should never arrive late to anything. Civil fairies live in the Fairy Village, which consists of toadstools which have doors and windows.

Fairies use magic and most of the fairies are named after flowers or other plants. Elves have their own catchphrase, "...and I'm an Elf" (or "We're Elves"), commonly tooting their instrument (most often a horn) afterward. Fairies also have their catchphrase, commonly "I'm a fairy", sometimes waving their wands afterwards as a kind of parody of the elves’ culture. Elves tell the time with wrist watches and/or clocks, while fairies tell the time with the sounds of different kinds of birds. The Elves operate Elf Rescue, the Elf Farm and the Elf Windmill. King Thistle likes to play golf and Ben & Holly's invention, crazy golf at the Royal Course. Ben and Holly have a ladybird friend called Gaston. Nanny Plum and the Wise Old Elf are characters too, and they have important jobs to do in the context of the show. Mr. and Mrs. Elf are Ben's parents.

Episodes

Characters

Major
 Ben Elf is an 8-year-old elf, and one of the titular protagonists alongside his best friend, Princess Holly. He lives with his parents, Mr. and Mrs. Elf in a tree (known as Great Elf Tree) alongside with all the other elves. He can be quite tentative when it comes to using magic, as he is a young elf and elves generally dislike the use of magic. He does not have any siblings but has plenty of friends, his best friend is Princess Holly. He is a patient young elf, whenever the two (Holly and Ben) go out to play Holly is often late but he patiently waits for her every time, even though Holly is seldom punctual in meetings, nearly forgetting his birthday once. Ben is voiced by Preston Nyman.
 Holly Thistle, more commonly known as Princess Holly, is an 8-year-old fairy, and one of the titular protagonists alongside her best friend, Ben Elf. She is a cheerful, tidy and clever princess who lives with her parents, King and Queen Thistle, her younger twin sisters, Daisy and Poppy and the royal family's nanny, Nanny Plum. She likes to use magic despite the risk of things going wrong, a reference to the great curiosity in young children. She likes playing with Ben Elf and there is a lot of platonic love between them. Holly is voiced by Sian Taylor.
 King Thistle is the King of the Little Kingdom and the husband of Queen Thistle. He is also Princess Holly, Daisy, and Poppy's father. He is often hungry and grumpy and sometimes hates having a bath though he can be quite a gentle, kind and loving father. He dislikes celebrating his birthday because it reminds him he is getting older. King Thistle is voiced by Ian Puleston-Davies.
 Queen Thistle is the Queen consort of the Little Kingdom and the wife of King Thistle. She is also Princess Holly, Daisy, and Poppy's mother. Her personality is much like Holly's, kind-hearted, loving and sweet though she too can become quite upset or angry if something has gone wrong. She is possibly the only person who can handle looking after Daisy and Poppy, though at times even she can be overwhelmed by the trouble they cause with their magic. She is Queen Marigold's younger sister. Queen Thistle is voiced by Sara Crowe.
 Daisy and Poppy are Holly's 3-year-old younger twin sisters. They are not very good at magic and don't know that many spells as they are only toddlers, but this does not stop them from trying to cause chaos with the dangerous spells they do know. They are quite cheeky and usually end up causing trouble with magic. As Daisy and Poppy can be very naughty, Holly sometimes dislikes her sisters due to the trouble they cause with their magic. Most of the adult characters are wary of them too, though Queen Thistle seems to be able to deal with them for the most part. Daisy and Poppy are voiced by Zoë Baker, the same voice actress acting as the zebra twins from Peppa Pig.
 Nanny Plum is Holly, Daisy, and Poppy's nanny, and a general housekeeper for the King and Queen. She is very good at magic and capable of speaking many animal languages (including ones which she claims to be a bit difficult such as Mole, Aardvark, Ant, Centipede and even Alien). She often ends up in all kinds of trouble when trying to help Holly and her friends. She is also a tooth fairy. Although being quite bossy and savage she usually is a helpful and funny character. She is very good at cleaning with magic. She rivals the Wise Old Elf mainly due to their differing opinions over the use of magic. She is a teacher at the Fairy School. Nanny Plum is voiced by Sarah Ann Kennedy, the same voice actress acting as Miss Rabbit and Mummy Rabbit from Peppa Pig.
 Cedric Elf, more commonly known as The Wise Old Elf, lives near the top of the Great Elf Tree. Since he is the series' "Jack of all trades, master of none", he also is the Wise Old Tailor, Wise Old Plumber, the elf doctor and the librarian. He also runs the Elf School and the Elf factory. He rivals Nanny Plum and strongly disapproves of the use of magic, but used to admire magic and enjoyed himself when he was briefly given the ability to use magic. He also secretly used magic to fuel the Elf Engine that runs the Elf Factory, as it is clean energy ("a very small carbon footprint" he claims) and never runs out except on No Magic Day which occurs every blue moon. He has three kids, two of which are pirates, Redbeard the Elf Pirate and Captain Squid, and an elf son who dreamed of becoming a Viking, as shown in the episode 'Father's Day'. The Wise Old Elf's real name is Cedric, as what Granny and Grandpapa Thistle address him. He went to college with Granny and Grandpapa Thistle. He was known to be married, although his wife may have passed away before the show, thus making him a widower. He has a twin brother, an Arctic Elf named "The Wiser Older Elf". The Wise Old Elf is voiced by David Graham. A running gag is that Elf Rescue, run by the Wise Old Elf, is a parody of International Rescue in the 1960s television series Thunderbirds, with comparable rocket-powered rescue vehicles and similar strident accompanying music. David Graham, who voices the Wise Old Elf, also voiced Aloysius Parker the chauffeur in Thunderbirds.
 Mr. Elf is Ben Elf's father and Mrs. Elf's husband. He is very serious and often likes hard work. He is the food deliverer to the fairies and elves and delivers presents to Father Christmas. He once was a sailor and he quite enjoyed being one until a fish known as "Big Bad Barry", ate most of his boats after that experience he decided he will not sail again. He retired and instead worked to deliver food to the people of the Little Kingdom.
 Mrs. Elf is Ben Elf's mother and Mr. Elf's wife. She is a very caring and cheerful female adult elf who enjoys taking holidays (although it was her desire thanks to Mr. Elf's hard-working attitude which probably kept them from doing so). Mrs. Elf is like a typical housewife, helping out with her family's chores. Mrs. Elf also help the family out by making food. She is voiced by Judy Flynn.

Minor
 Gaston the Ladybird is a male ladybird who lives in a small cave. He likes his house being messy as well as food that is "smelly and foul". He does not mind giving Ben rides when Ben needs to fly. Nanny Plum, who understands Ladybird language, translates for him quite often. He acts quite similarly to a dog, making a barking sound when he "speaks", and also fetching sticks. Gaston has a brother, Tony, a sister-in-law, Pam, two nieces, Amber and Emerald, and a nephew, Keith. Gaston is voiced by Taig McNab, who is also credited as Editor for Ben & Holly's Little Kingdom. Gaston also has a production company named after him, "Gaston's Cave Limited" and it is currently credited for season 6 of Peppa Pig.
 Lucy Big is an 8-year-old girl who lives with her parents in the Big (normal) World. She, her mum (Mrs. Big), her dad (Mr. Big) and her teacher, Miss Cookie are the only big people who know about the Little Kingdom. She is voiced by Abigail Daniels.
 Miss Jolly is a snail riding teacher and a pet trainer. She also has a snail called Trigger.
 Redbeard the Elf Pirate (Nigel) is the pirate uncle of Barnaby Elf and also the son of the Wise Old Elf. He is introduced in series 1, episode 31, where it is also revealed that his real name is Nigel. He sails the oceans in a pirate ship named Pedro, though his size prevents him from engaging in acts of actual piracy, and he is more of a treasure hunter and explorer. He is quite smitten with Nanny Plum whom he considers to be his sweetheart, however Nanny Plum seems to have little interest in him romantically but deep down, Nanny Plum loves him back. He has a pet parrot, Polly, although she is normal-sized and barely fits inside Redbeard's ship. He is voiced by David Rintoul.
 Mrs. Fig is the teacher of Mrs. Fig's Magic School who notably speaks with a Scottish accent. Nanny Plum used to go there and Holly and her friends went there when they were old enough. Despite being a fairy, she detests magic and says the most important rules of magic are "Don't use magic" and "Magic should only be used for serious things". As a result, the Wise Old Elf likes her as they have similar views on magic. Mrs. Fig loathes Nanny Plum, who is implied to have been her worst student as she does not adhere to Mrs. Fig's ideas on magic. Mrs. Fig is voiced by Morwenna Banks.
 Mrs. Fotheringill is Daisy and Poppy's playgroup teacher. She was at one point sent back in time to the age of the dinosaurs by the children from her playgroup. She seems to be American due to her accent and when she called Gaston a "ladybug" (not to mention mistaking his gender). She is presumably an elf, although her ears are hidden under her bob and she has never been seen blowing her horn. Mrs. Fotheringill is voiced by Morwenna Banks.
 Mr. Gnome is a gnome that often wanders around the Little Kingdom ever since Nanny Plum magicked him into the Little Kingdom to keep moles out of the golf course. He later turned out to be a lazy, talkative, and gluttonous annoyance to the entire kingdom. After his debut appearance, whenever the characters find him, they scream in horror "Ah! The Gnome!" with a bass drum soundtrack representing the characters' fear.
 Gloria Gnome is presumably Mr. Gnome's "girlfriend". She was introduced in the episode, "Springtime". Gloria is voiced by Judy Flynn.
 King and Queen Marigold are the king and queen of a far-away kingdom far from the Little Kingdom. They are often described as "snooty" characters who tease and laugh at the Thistle family's misfortunes, such as judging the Little Castle and calling it a "shady-old" castle. But when their plans go wrong and most of the castle was demolished, the Marigolds unexpectedly find the remnants of their castle "modern" and "daring" instead of teasing them as Queen Thistle predicted. The Marigolds are a cheerful, happy-go-lucky and snooty satire of high-brow trends in modern art and fashion. Queen Marigold is Queen Thistle's older sister, making the Marigolds part of the Thistle family and the uncle and aunt of Holly, Daisy, and Poppy. Their castle appears to be based of Saint Basil's Cathedral in Moscow. King Marigold is voiced by John Sparkes and Queen Marigold is voiced by Morwenna Banks.
 Milicent "Granny" Thistle is King Thistle's mother and Victor's wife. She often believes in using strong and dangerous magic and became a bad influence on Daisy and Poppy by teaching them how to do it and giving them the wands of their great-grandparents, hence a reference to how some grandparents spoil their grandchildren. It was her who revealed that The Wise Old Elf used to love magic, right before the Monkey's Kittens incident. She lives with Victor in a castle high in the clouds.
 Victor "Grandpapa" Thistle is King Thistle's father and Milicent's husband. He is "extremely bonkers" and along with his wife, he also believes in using wacky and dangerous magic. He, Milicent, and the Wise Old Elf (who they referred to by his real name, Cedric), attended the same college, and like Milicent, he too spoiled Daisy and Poppy in his last appearance in the episode "Journey to the Centre of the Earth" by intending to take them on a trip to a volcano.
 Mrs. Witch is a witch who lives in a small cottage in the Little Kingdom. Although there was a time Holly wanted to know if she was evil, she turned out to be a nice witch who only gets angry or does something bad (like when she turned Nanny Plum into stone) when she is insulted, especially the fact that she is touchy about her private cat, Moggy.
 Captain Squid is also a pirate, along with Redbeard the Elf Pirate. He is Redbeard's brother and also the Wise Old Elf's son. Captain Squid is voiced by Andy Hamilton.
 Barnaby Elf is a cheerful, loud, talkative and giggly friend of Ben, He is Redbeard the Elf Pirate’s son and also the Wise Old Elf's grandson. Barnaby is voiced by Stanley Nickless.
 Strawberry Fairy is a fairy who is friends with Holly and often attends lessons with her. She is very cheerful, happy-go-lucky, bubbly and silly, and has her hair styled in a small tulip bun. Her mum is the vet of the Little Kingdom. Strawberry is voiced by Zara Siddiqi.
 The Fairy Mayor is a character based on Boris Johnson, the former mayor of London and former prime minister of the United Kingdom. He is Strawberry's dad. He does not like "big people" because they always step on fairies and elves. He is voiced by Alexander Armstrong.
 Zyros is an alien that lives on Planet Bong. He gets offended when he is called a baby, he likes magic jelly and he has a fear of big people. The character was voiced by Bram Karek.

Broadcast
In the United Kingdom and Ireland the show was broadcast on Channel 5 kids programming block, Milkshake! It was also broadcast on Nick Jr. UK and Ireland. In Canada, the show was broadcast on Treehouse TV. In the United States, the show was broadcast on Nick Jr. The series also airs on Baraem in Qatar. On 1 June 2021, the entire show became available on Netflix. It was broadcast across Nickelodeon's channels throughout Africa, Asia-Pacific, Europe, the Middle East, Latin America and North America.

Reception
Common Sense Media gave the show a 4 out of 5, calling it "charming" and saying it promoted friendship and perseverance. The Toy Insider also gave the show positive review, saying it was entertaining and also taught positive values.

References

External links
 Official Website of Ben & Holly's Little Kingdom
 Ben & Holly's Little Kingdom on Nick Jr. UK
 Ben & Holly's Little Kingdom on the Australian Broadcasting Corporation website
 

2000s British animated television series
2010s British animated television series
2000s British children's television series
2010s British children's television series
British preschool education television series
2000s preschool education television series
2010s preschool education television series
2009 British television series debuts
2013 British television series endings
British children's animated comedy television series
British children's animated fantasy television series
British flash animated television series
BAFTA winners (television series)
English-language television shows
Channel 5 (British TV channel) original programming
Nick Jr. original programming
Treehouse TV original programming
Television series by Entertainment One
Elves in popular culture
Animated television series about children
Television about fairies and sprites
Television about magic